Sphinx Mountain is a linear mountain, 1,850 m, trending in a north-south direction for 6 nautical miles (11 km), standing 5 nautical miles (9 km) east of Nordwestliche Insel Mountains in the Wohlthat Mountains of Queen Maud Land. This mountain was discovered by the German Antarctic Expedition, 1938–39, who gave the name Sphinx to its northern peak. The name was extended to this mountain by Norwegian Antarctic Expedition, 1956–60, and the Soviet Antarctic Expedition, 1960–61, who referred to it as Sfinksen (the sphinx) and Gora Sfinks (sphinx mountain), respectively. The recommended spelling has been chosen to agree with the original German form. Sphinxkopf Peak is at the northern end of Sphinx Mountain. 

Mountains of Queen Maud Land
Princess Astrid Coast